The following is a list of churches in Christchurch, Dorset.

Active 

 All Saints Church Mudeford. The church burned down on 14 July 2022.
 Christchurch Priory
GodFirst Church

References 

Christchurch
Christchurch